Delphi City Hall, also known as the Assian-Ruffing Building and Old City Hall-Opera House, is a historic city hall located at 105-109 Washington Street in Delphi, Indiana. It was built in 1865, and is a three-story, Italianate style red brick building. The third floor was remodeled for use as an opera house in 1881. The building was damaged by a fire in December 1914 and the third floor has remained vacant since.

It was listed on the National Register of Historic Places in 1998.  It is located in the Delphi Courthouse Square Historic District.

References

1865 establishments in Indiana
City and town halls on the National Register of Historic Places in Indiana
Italianate architecture in Indiana
Government buildings completed in 1865
Buildings and structures in Carroll County, Indiana
National Register of Historic Places in Carroll County, Indiana
Historic district contributing properties in Indiana
Delphi, Indiana